William F. Broidy (1915–1959) was an American film and television producer.

Early life
William F. Broidy was born on April 12, 1915, in Chelsea, Massachusetts, a suburb of Boston. He had a brother, Steve Broidy, who later became the head of Allied Artists Productions.

Career
Broidy produced many films throughout the 1950s, including Northwest Territory, Bullwhip, Arson for Hire, etc. On television, he was the producer of The Adventures of Wild Bill Hickok from 1951 to 1958.

Personal life
With his wife Frances, he had three sons. His wife organized events for the Hadassah Women's Zionist Organization of America at their home in the San Fernando Valley in the 1950s.

Death
Mr. Broidy died on July 14, 1959, in Los Angeles, California.

Filmography
Trail of the Yukon (1949, associate producer).
The Wolf Hunters (1949, associate producer).
Sideshow (1950, screenwriter and producer).
A Modern Marriage (1950, associate producer).
Snow Dog (1950, associate producer).
Call of the Klondike (1950, associate producer).
Rhythm Inn (1951, associate producer).
Navy Bound (1951, producer).
Casa Manana (1951, associate producer).
Yukon Manhunt (1951, associate producer).
Northwest Territory (1951, associate producer).
Sea Tiger (1952, executive producer).
Yukon Gold (1952, producer).
The Yellow Haired Kid (1952, executive producer).
The Ghost of Crossbones Canyon (1952, executive producer).
Behind Southern Lines (1952, executive producer).
Murder Without Tears (1953, producer).
Two Gun Marshal (1953, executive producer).
Six Gun Decision (1953, executive producer).
Secret of Outlaw Flats (1953, producer).
Border City Rustlers (1953, executive producer).
Yukon Vengeance (1954, producer).
Highway Dragnet (1954, executive producer).
Security Risk (1954, producer).
Port of Hell (1954, producer).
Trouble on the Trail (1954, executive producer).
Treasure of Ruby Hills (1955, producer).
The Big Tip Off (1955, producer).
Timber Country Trouble (1955, producer).
The Titled Tenderfoot (1955, executive producer).
The Matchmaking Marshal (1955, executive producer).
Phantom Trails (1955, executive producer).
Las Vegas Shakedown (1955, producer).
Betrayed Women (1955, producer).
Nile Freight (1955, producer).
The Toughest Man Alive (1955, producer).
Shack Out on 101 (1955, executive producer).
Yaqui Drums (1956, producer).
Calypso Joe (1957, producer).
Seven Guns to Mesa (1958, producer).
Bullwhip (1958, executive producer).
Legion of the Doomed (1958, producer).
Arson for Hire (1959, producer).

References

1915 births
1959 deaths
People from Chelsea, Massachusetts
People from Los Angeles
Film producers from California
Television producers from California
Film producers from Massachusetts